Karl Eðvarð Þórðarson (born 31 May 1955) is an Icelandic former footballer who is last known to have played as a midfielder for ÍA. Besides Iceland, he has played in Belgium and France.

Career

Þórðarson was voted 1978 Icelandic Footballer of the Year. In 1978, he signed for Belgian side RAAL. In 1981, Þórðarson signed for Laval in the French Ligue 1, where he made 98 league appearances and scored 12 goals. On 23 July 1981, he debuted for Laval during a 1–1 draw with Sochaux. On 3 August 1981, Þórðarson scored his first 2 goals for Laval during a 2–0 win over Auxerre. In 1984, he signed for Icelandic club ÍA.

He is a former Iceland international.

References

External links
 

Icelandic footballers
Expatriate footballers in France
Expatriate footballers in Belgium
Stade Lavallois players
Ligue 1 players
R.A.A. Louviéroise players
1955 births
Íþróttabandalag Akraness players
Belgian Pro League players
Úrvalsdeild karla (football) players
Icelandic expatriate sportspeople in France
Living people
Iceland international footballers
Association football midfielders
Icelandic expatriate sportspeople in Belgium
Icelandic expatriate footballers